Jan von Arx (born February 9, 1978) is a professional ice hockey player currently playing for HC Davos. He is the younger brother of Reto von Arx.

He also played in SC Herisau and SC Langnau.

Stats

(GP = Games played; G = Goals; A = Assists; Pts = Points; PIM = Penalty minutes)

References

External links
 

1978 births
Living people
HC Davos players
Swiss ice hockey defencemen